Robert Lutz was the defending champion but did not compete that year.

Harold Solomon won in the final 6–3, 2–6, 6–3, 6–4 against Corrado Barazzutti.

Seeds
A champion seed is indicated in bold text while text in italics indicates the round in which that seed was eliminated.

  Harold Solomon (champion)
  Brian Gottfried (semifinals)
  Corrado Barazzutti (final)
  Vince Van Patten (semifinals)
  Raúl Ramírez (quarterfinals)
  Pascal Portes (quarterfinals)
  Jean-Louis Haillet (quarterfinals)
  Jean-François Caujolle (quarterfinals)

Draw

 NB: The Final was the best of 5 sets while all other rounds were the best of 3 sets.

Final

Section 1

Section 2

External links
 1979 Paris Open draw

Singles